Adrian Young (born 1969) is an American drummer for the rock band No Doubt.

Adrian Young also refers to:

Adrian Young (American football) (born 1946)
Adrian Young (footballer) (1943–2020), Australian rules footballer

See also
Adrian Younge (born 1978), American composer and music producer